Linguistics: An Interdisciplinary Journal of the Language Sciences is a peer-reviewed academic journal of general linguistics published by De Gruyter Mouton. The journal publishes both articles and book reviews. It  publishes two special issues a year. The current Editor-in-Chief is Johan van der Auwera. Since 2010, it publishes 1400 pages per year.

History
Linguistics was started in 1963 by Mouton Publishers in The Hague, apparently on the initiative of Mouton's Peter de Ridder as well as linguist C.H. van Schooneveld. In 1979, after Mouton had been bought by Walter de Gruyter, a new editorial board was established, consisting of Brian Butterworth, Bernard Comrie, Östen Dahl, Norbert Dittmar, Flip Droste, Jaap van Marle, and Jürgen Weissenborn. De facto, Brian Butterworth was editor-in-chief between 1979 and 1982. From 1982 through 2005, the editor was Wolfgang Klein, who was succeeded by Johan van der Auwera.

Abstracting and indexing 
The journal is abstracted and indexed in:

The journal has a Thomson Reuters 2015 impact factor of 0.763 and a 5-year impact factor of 0.872.

References

External links 
 

Linguistics journals
Bimonthly journals
English-language journals
Publications established in 1963
De Gruyter academic journals